Marden railway station is on the South Eastern Main Line in England, serving the village of Marden in the borough of Maidstone, Kent. It is  down the line from London Charing Cross . The station and all trains that serve the station are operated by Southeastern. The station is often referred to as Marden (Kent), to distinguish itself between similarly-named villages across England.

History
It was built to serve local goods traffic, particularly the transport of fruit from the orchards surrounding Marden.

The goods shed was designed so that wagons could not pass through it. The yard was expanded in 1908, adding an additional siding. The station was completely revamped in 1961 in preparation for the electrification of the South East Main line, including an additional footbridge.

Facilities
Along with similar sized stations along the South East Main Line, the ticket office is only staffed part-time. A ticket machine is available for other times.

Accidents and incidents 

At 20:42 on 4 January 1969 there was a collision between a down electric passenger train (formed of 2 x 4CEP units) and a down parcels train to the west of Marden station. Four people were killed. The cause was the driver of the passenger train missing a signal in fog and passing it at danger. Local farmer David Winch of Brook Farm, along with his employees, worked for fourteen hours assisting in the rescue operation. They used their tractors and trailers to ferry the injured across muddy fields from the crash site to waiting ambulances. The ambulance officer in charge at the time, Stanley Skinner, was awarded a British Empire Medal in recognition of his role.

On 5 September 2012, an up passenger train caught fire at Marden. The blaze was under control within half an hour. Passengers were evacuated and services between Tonbridge and Ashford were disrupted.

Services 
All services at Marden are operated by Southeastern using  EMUs.

The typical off-peak service in trains per hour is:

 2 tph to London Charing Cross
 1 tph to 
 1 tph to  via 

During the peak hours, there are additional services to and from London Cannon Street and the service to Dover Priory is extended to and from Ramsgate via .

References 
Citations

Sources

External links 

 Eyewitness account of the 1969 train crash.
Signal box diagram, 1951
Marden on navigable 1940 OS map

Borough of Maidstone
Railway stations in Kent
DfT Category E stations
Former South Eastern Railway (UK) stations
Railway stations in Great Britain opened in 1842
Railway stations served by Southeastern
1842 establishments in England